The Communist International (Comintern), also known as the Third International, was a Soviet-controlled international organization founded in 1919 that advocated world communism. The Comintern resolved at its Second Congress to "struggle by all available means, including armed force, for the overthrow of the international bourgeoisie and the creation of an international Soviet republic as a transition stage to the complete abolition of the state". The Comintern was preceded by the 1916 dissolution of the Second International.

The Comintern held seven World Congresses in Moscow between 1919 and 1935. During that period, it also conducted thirteen Enlarged Plenums of its governing Executive Committee, which had much the same function as the somewhat larger and more grandiose Congresses. Joseph Stalin, leader of the Soviet Union, dissolved the Comintern in 1943 to avoid antagonizing his allies in the later years of World War II, the United States and the United Kingdom. It was succeeded by the Cominform in 1947.

Organizational history

Failure of the Second International 
Differences between the revolutionary and reformist wings of the workers' movement had been increasing for decades, but the outbreak of World War I was the catalyst for their separation. The Triple Alliance comprised two empires, while the Triple Entente was formed by three. Socialists had historically been anti-war and internationalist, fighting against what they perceived as militarist exploitation of the proletariat for bourgeois states. A majority of socialists voted in favor of resolutions for the Second International to call upon the international working class to resist war if it were declared.

But after the beginning of World War I, many European socialist parties announced support for the war effort of their respective nations. Exceptions were the British Labour Party and the socialist parties of the Balkans. To Vladimir Lenin's surprise, even the Social Democratic Party of Germany voted in favor of war. After influential anti-war French Socialist Jean Jaurès was assassinated on 31 July 1914, the socialist parties hardened their support in France for their government of national unity.

Socialist parties in neutral countries mostly supported neutrality, rather than totally opposing the war. On the other hand, during the 1915 Zimmerwald Conference, Lenin, then a Swiss resident refugee, organized an opposition to the "imperialist war" as the Zimmerwald Left, publishing the pamphlet Socialism and War where he called socialists collaborating with their national governments social chauvinists, i.e. socialists in word, but nationalists in deed.

The Second International divided into a revolutionary left-wing, a moderate center-wing, and a more reformist right-wing. Lenin condemned much of the center as "social pacifists" for several reasons, including their vote for war credits despite publicly opposing the war. Lenin's term "social pacifist" aimed in particular at Ramsay MacDonald, leader of the Independent Labour Party in Britain, who opposed the war on grounds of pacifism but did not actively fight against it.

Discredited by its apathy towards world events, the Second International dissolved in 1916. In 1917, after the February Revolution overthrew the Romanov Dynasty, Lenin published the April Theses which openly supported revolutionary defeatism, where the Bolsheviks hoped that Russia would lose the war so that they could quickly cause a socialist insurrection.

Impact of the Russian Revolution 

The victory of the Russian Communist Party in the Bolshevik Revolution of November 1917 was felt throughout the world and an alternative path to power to parliamentary politics was demonstrated. With much of Europe on the verge of economic and political collapse in the aftermath of the carnage of World War I, revolutionary sentiments were widespread. The Russian Bolsheviks headed by Lenin believed that unless socialist revolution swept Europe, they would be crushed by the military might of world capitalism just as the Paris Commune had been crushed by force of arms in 1871. The Bolsheviks believed that this required a new international to foment revolution in Europe and around the world.

First Period of the Comintern 
During this early period (1919–1924), known as the First Period in Comintern history, with the Bolshevik Revolution under attack in the Russian Civil War and a wave of revolutions across Europe, the Comintern's priority was exporting the October Revolution. Some communist parties had secret military wings. One example is the M-Apparat of the Communist Party of Germany. 

The Comintern was involved in the revolutions across Europe in this period, starting with the Hungarian Soviet Republic in 1919. Several hundred agitators and financial aid were sent from the Soviet Union and Lenin was in regular contact with its leader Béla Kun. The next attempt was the March Action in Germany in 1921, including an attempt to dynamite the express train from Halle to Leipzig. After this failed, the Communist Party of Germany expelled its former chairman Paul Levi from the party for publicly criticising the March Action in a pamphlet, which was ratified by the Executive Committee of the Communist International prior to the Third Congress. A new attempt was made at the time of the Ruhr crisis in spring and then again in selected parts of Germany in the autumn of 1923. The Red Army was mobilized, ready to come to the aid of the planned insurrection. Resolute action by the German government cancelled the plans, except due to miscommunication in Hamburg, where 200–300 communists attacked police stations, but were quickly defeated. In 1924, there was a failed coup in Estonia by the Communist Party of Estonia.

Founding Congress 

The Comintern was founded at a Congress held in Moscow on 2–6 March 1919. It opened with a tribute to Karl Liebknecht and Rosa Luxemburg, recently murdered by the Freikorps during the Spartacist Uprising, against the backdrop of the Russian Civil War. There were 52 delegates present from 34 parties. They decided to form an Executive Committee with representatives of the most important sections and that other parties joining the International would have their own representatives. The Congress decided that the Executive Committee would elect a five-member bureau to run the daily affairs of the International. However, such a bureau was not formed and Lenin, Leon Trotsky and Christian Rakovsky later delegated the task of managing the International to Grigory Zinoviev as the Chairman of the Executive. Zinoviev was assisted by Angelica Balabanoff, acting as the secretary of the International, Victor L. Kibaltchitch and Vladmir Ossipovich Mazin. Lenin, Trotsky and Alexandra Kollontai presented material. The main topic of discussion was the difference between bourgeois democracy and the dictatorship of the proletariat.

The following parties and movements were invited to the Founding Congress:
 Russian Communist Party (Bolsheviks)
 Spartacus League (later became the Communist Party of Germany)
 Communist Party of German Austria
 Hungarian Communist Workers' Party (in power during Béla Kun's Hungarian Soviet Republic)
 Communist Party of Finland
 Polish Communist Workers’ Party
 Communist Party of Estonia
 Communist Party of Latvia
 Communist Party of Lithuania
 Communist Party (Bolsheviks) of Byelorussia
 Communist Party (Bolsheviks) of Ukraine (Ukrainian section of Russian Communist Party)
 The revolutionary elements of the Czechoslovak Social Democratic Party (who founded the Communist Party of Czechoslovakia)
 Social Democratic and Labour Party of Bulgaria (Tesnyatsi)
 Left-wing of the Socialist Party of Romania (who would create the Romanian Communist Party)
 Left-wing of the Serbian Social Democratic Party (later formed the League of Communists of Yugoslavia) 
 Social Democratic Left Party of Sweden
 Norwegian Labour Party
 For Denmark, the Klassekampen group
 Communist Party of the Netherlands
 Revolutionary elements of the Belgian Labour Party (who would create the Communist Party of Belgium in 1921)
 Groups and organizations within the French socialist and syndicalist movements
 Left-wing within the Social Democratic Party of Switzerland (later formed the Communist Party of Switzerland)
 Italian Socialist Party
 Revolutionary elements of the Spanish Socialist Workers' Party (formed the Spanish Communist Party and the Spanish Communist Workers' Party)
 Revolutionary elements of the Portuguese Socialist Party (formed the Portuguese Maximalist Federation)
 British socialist parties (particularly the current represented by John Maclean)
 Socialist Labour Party (United Kingdom)
 Revolutionary Workers' Groups in Ireland
 Revolutionary elements among the Shop stewards (United Kingdom)
 Socialist Labor Party (United States)
 Left elements of the Socialist Party of America (the tendency represented by the Socialist Propaganda League of America, later formed the Communist Party USA)
 Industrial Workers of the World (international trade union based in the United States)
 Workers' International Industrial Union (United States)
 The Socialist groups of Tokyo and Yokohama (Japan, represented by Sen Katayama)
 Socialist Youth International (represented by Willi Münzenberg)

Of these, the following attended (see list of delegates of the 1st Comintern congress): the communist parties of Russia, Germany, German Austria, Hungary, Poland, Finland, Ukraine, Latvia, Lithuania, Byelorussia, Estonia, Armenia, the Volga German region; the Swedish Social Democratic Left Party (the opposition), Balkan Revolutionary People's of Russia; Zimmerwald Left Wing of France; the Czech, Bulgarian, Yugoslav, British, French and Swiss Communist Groups; the Dutch Social-Democratic Group; Socialist Propaganda League and the Socialist Labor Party of America; Socialist Workers' Party of China; Korean Workers' Union, Turkestan, Turkish, Georgian, Azerbaijanian and Persian Sections of the Central Bureau of the Eastern People's and the Zimmerwald Commission.

Zinoviev served as the first Chairman of the Comintern's Executive Committee from 1919 to 1926, but its dominant figure until his death in January 1924 was Lenin, whose strategy for revolution had been laid out in What Is to Be Done? (1902). The central policy of the Comintern under Lenin's leadership was that communist parties should be established across the world to aid the international proletarian revolution. The parties also shared his principle of democratic centralism (freedom of discussion, unity of action), namely that parties would make decisions democratically, but uphold in a disciplined fashion whatever decision was made. In this period, the Comintern was promoted as the general staff of the world revolution.

Second World Congress 

Ahead of the Second Congress of the Communist International, held in July through August 1920, Lenin sent out a number of documents, including his Twenty-one Conditions to all socialist parties. Congress adopted the 21 conditions as prerequisites for any group wanting to become affiliated with the International. The 21 Conditions called for the demarcation between communist parties and other socialist groups and instructed the Comintern sections not to trust the legality of the bourgeois states. They also called for the build-up of party organisations along democratic centralist lines in which the party press and parliamentary factions would be under the direct control of the party leadership.

Regarding the political situation in the colonized world, the Second Congress of the Communist International stipulated that a united front should be formed between the proletariat, peasantry, and national bourgeoisie in the colonial countries. Amongst the twenty-one conditions drafted by Lenin ahead of the congress was the 11th thesis which stipulated that all communist parties must support the bourgeois-democratic liberation movements in the colonies. Notably, some of the delegates opposed the idea of an alliance with the bourgeoisie and preferred giving support to communist movements in these countries instead. Their criticism was shared by the Indian revolutionary M. N. Roy, who attended as a delegate of the Mexican Communist Party. The Congress removed the term bourgeois-democratic in what became the 8th condition.

Many European socialist parties were divided because of the adhesion issue. The French Section of the Workers International (SFIO) thus broke away with the 1920 Tours Congress, leading to the creation of the new French Communist Party (initially called French Section of the Communist International – SFIC). The Communist Party of Spain was created in 1920, the Communist Party of Italy was created in 1921, the Belgian Communist Party in September 1921, and so on.

Third World Congress 

The Third Congress of the Communist International was held between 22 June–12 July 1921 in Moscow.

Fourth World Congress 

The Fourth Congress, held in November 1922, at which Trotsky played a prominent role, continued in this vein.

In 1924, the Mongolian People's Revolutionary Party joined the Comintern. At first, in China both the Chinese Communist Party and the Kuomintang were supported. After the definite break with Chiang Kai-shek in 1927, Joseph Stalin sent personal emissaries to help organize revolts which at this time failed.

The Fourth World Congress was coincidentally held within days of the March on Rome by Benito Mussolini and his PNF in Italy. Karl Radek lamented the proceedings in Italy as the "largest defeat suffered by socialism and communism since the beginning of the period of world revolution", and Zinoviev programmatically announced the similarities between fascism and social democracy, laying the groundwork for the later social fascism theory.

Fifth to Seventh World Congresses: 1925–1935

Second Period 

Lenin died in 1924 and the next year saw a shift in the organization's focus from the immediate activity of world revolution towards a defence of the Soviet state. In that year, Joseph Stalin took power in Moscow and upheld the thesis of socialism in one country, detailed by Nikolai Bukharin in his brochure Can We Build Socialism in One Country in the Absence of the Victory of the West-European Proletariat? (April 1925). The position was finalized as the state policy after Stalin's January 1926 article On the Issues of Leninism. Stalin made the party line clear: "An internationalist is one who is ready to defend the USSR without reservation, without wavering, unconditionally; for the USSR it is the base of the world revolutionary movement, and this revolutionary movement cannot be defended and promoted without defending the USSR".

The dream of a world revolution was abandoned after the failures of the Spartacist uprising in Germany and of the Hungarian Soviet Republic and the failure of all revolutionary movements in Europe such as in Italy, where the fascist squadristi broke the strikes during the Biennio Rosso and quickly assumed power following the 1922 March on Rome. This period up to 1928 was known as the Second Period, mirroring the shift in the Soviet Union from war communism to the New Economic Policy.

At the Fifth World Congress of the Comintern in July 1924, Zinoviev condemned both Marxist philosopher Georg Lukács's History and Class Consciousness, published in 1923 after his involvement in Béla Kun's Hungarian Soviet Republic, and Karl Korsch's Marxism and Philosophy. Zinoviev himself was dismissed in 1926 after falling out of favor with Stalin. Bukharin then led the Comintern for two years until 1928, when he too fell out with Stalin. Bulgarian communist leader Georgi Dimitrov headed the Comintern in 1934 and presided until its dissolution.

Geoff Eley summed up the change in attitude at this time as follows: By the Fifth Comintern Congress in July 1924 [...] the collapse of Communist support in Europe tightened the pressure for conformity. A new policy of "Bolshevization" was adopted, which dragooned the CPs toward stricter bureaucratic centralism. This flattened out the earlier diversity of radicalisms, welding them into a single approved model of Communist organization. Only then did the new parties retreat from broader Left arenas into their own belligerent world, even if many local cultures of broader cooperation persisted. Respect for Bolshevik achievements and defense of the Russian Revolution now transmuted into dependency on Moscow and belief in Soviet infallibility. Depressing cycles of "internal rectification" began, disgracing and expelling successive leaderships, so that by the later 1920s many founding Communists had gone. This process of coordination, in a hard-faced drive for uniformity, was finalized at the next Congress of the Third International in 1928.

The Comintern was a relatively small organization, but it devised novel ways of controlling communist parties around the world. In many places, there was a communist subculture, founded upon indigenous left-wing traditions which had never been controlled by Moscow. The Comintern attempted to establish control over party leaderships by sending agents who bolstered certain factions, by judicious use of secret funding, by expelling independent-minded activists and even by closing down entire national parties (such as the Communist Party of Poland in 1938). Above all, the Comintern exploited Soviet prestige in sharp contrast to the weaknesses of local parties that rarely had political power.

Communist front organizations 

Communist front organizations were set up to attract non-members who agreed with the party on certain specific points. Opposition to fascism was a common theme in the popular front era of the mid 1930s. The well-known names and prestige of artists, intellectuals and other fellow travelers were used to advance party positions. They often came to the Soviet Union for propaganda tours praising the future. Under the leadership of Zinoviev, the Comintern established fronts in many countries in the 1920s and after. To coordinate their activities, the Comintern set up international umbrella organizations linking groups across national borders, such as the Young Communist International (youth), Profintern (trade unions), Krestintern (peasants), International Red Aid (humanitarian aid), Sportintern (organized sports), and more. Front organizations were especially influential in France, which in 1933 became the base for communist front organizer Willi Münzenberg. These organizations were dissolved in the late 1930s or early 1940s.

Third Period 
In 1928, the Ninth Plenum of the Executive Committee began the so-called Third Period, which was to last until 1935. The Comintern proclaimed that the capitalist system was entering the period of final collapse and therefore all communist parties were to adopt an aggressive and militant ultra-left line. In particular, the Comintern labelled all moderate left-wing parties social fascists and urged the communists to destroy the moderate left. With the rise of the Nazi Party in Germany after the 1930 federal election, this stance became controversial.

The Sixth World Congress also revised the policy of united front in the colonial world. In 1927 in China, the Kuomintang had turned on the Chinese Communist Party, which led to a review of the policy on forming alliances with the national bourgeoisie in the colonial countries. The Congress did make a differentiation between the character of the Chinese Kuomintang on one hand and the Indian Swaraj Party and the Egyptian Wafd Party on the other, considering the latter as an unreliable ally yet not a direct enemy. The Congress called on the Indian Communists to utilize the contradictions between the national bourgeoisie and the British imperialists.

Seventh World Congress and the Popular Front 

The Seventh and last Congress of the Comintern was held between 25 July and 20 August 1935. It was attended by representatives of 65 communist parties. The main report was delivered by Dimitrov, other reports were delivered by Palmiro Togliatti, Wilhelm Pieck, and Dmitry Manuilsky. The Congress officially endorsed the popular front against fascism. This policy argued that communist parties should seek to form a popular front with all parties that opposed fascism and not limit themselves to forming a united front with those parties based in the working class. There was no significant opposition to this policy within any of the national sections of the Comintern. In France and Spain, it would have momentous consequences with Léon Blum's 1936 election which led to the Popular Front government.

Stalin's purges of the 1930s affected Comintern activists living in both the Soviet Union and overseas. At Stalin's direction, the Comintern was thoroughly infused with Soviet secret police and foreign intelligence operatives and informers working under Comintern guise. One of its leaders, Mikhail Trilisser, using the pseudonym Mikhail Aleksandrovich Moskvin, was in fact chief of the foreign department of the Soviet OGPU (later the NKVD). Numerous Comintern officials were also targeted by the dictator and became victims of show trials and political persecution, such as Grigory Zinoviev and Nikolai Bukharin. At Stalin's orders, 133 out of 492 Comintern staff members became victims of the Great Purge. Several hundred German communists and antifascists who had either fled from Nazi Germany or were convinced to relocate in the Soviet Union were liquidated, and more than a thousand were handed over to Germany. Wolfgang Leonhard, who experienced this period in Moscow as a contemporary witness, wrote about it in his political autobiography, which was published in the 1950s: “The foreign communists living in the Soviet Union were particularly affected. In a few months, more functionaries of the Comintern apparatus were arrested than had been put together by all bourgeois governments in twenty years. Just listing the names would fill entire pages.” Fritz Platten died in a labor camp and the leaders of the Indian (Virendranath Chattopadhyaya or Chatto), Korean, Mexican, Iranian, and Turkish communist parties were executed. Out of 11 Mongolian Communist Party leaders, only Khorloogiin Choibalsan survived. Leopold Trepper recalled these days: "In house, where the party activists of all the countries were living, no-one slept until 3 o'clock in the morning. [...] Exactly 3 o'clock the car lights began to be seen [...] we stayed near the window and waited [to find out], where the car stopped".

Among those persecuted were many KPD functionaries, such as members of the KPD Central Committee, who believed they had found safe asylum in the Soviet Union after Adolf Hitler's rise to power. Among them was Hugo Eberlein, who had been present at the 1919 Comintern founding congress.

Trotsky, who was also marginalized and persecuted by Stalin, and other communists founded the Fourth International in 1938 as an oppositional alternative to the Stalin-dominated Comintern. In the years that followed, however, their sections rarely got beyond the status of the smallest cadre or splinter parties.

Although the General Association of German Anti-Communist Associations had existed in Berlin since 1933 as part of the Nazi government's propaganda against the Soviet Union and the Comintern, a treaty of assistance was concluded between Germany and Japan in 1936, the Anti-Comintern Pact. In it, the two states agreed to fight the Comintern and assured each other that they would not sign any treaties with the Soviet Union that would contradict the anti-communist spirit of the agreement. However, this did not prevent Hitler from signing the Nazi-Soviet pact with Stalin in August 1939, which in turn meant the end of the Popular Front policy and, in fact, that of the Comintern as well.

Dissolution 
The German-Soviet non-aggression treaty contained far-reaching agreements on spheres of interest, which the two totalitarian powers implemented over the next two years using military means. On 3 September 1939, France and the United Kingdom declared war on Germany after its invasion of Poland, beginning World War II in Europe. The Comintern sections now found themselves in the politically suicidal situation of having to support, for example, the Soviet invasion and subsequent annexation of Eastern Poland. The Soviet Foreign Minister Vyacheslav Molotov declared on October 31 that it was not Hitler's Germany but rather Britain and France that were to be regarded as the aggressors. The weakened and decimated Comintern was forced to officially adopt a policy of non-intervention, declaring on November 6 that the conflict was an imperialist war between various national ruling classes on both sides, much like World War I had been, and that the main culprits were Britain and France.

This period, during which the Comintern enabled Hitlerite fascism, only ended on 22 June 1941 with the invasion of the Soviet Union, when the Comintern changed its position to one of active support for the Allies. During these two years, many communists turned their backs on their Comintern sections, and the organization lost its political credibility and relevance. On 15 May 1943, a declaration of the Executive Committee was sent out to all sections of the International, calling for the dissolution of the Comintern. The declaration read: The historical role of the Communist International, organized in 1919 as a result of the political collapse of the overwhelming majority of the old pre-war workers' parties, consisted in that it preserved the teachings of Marxism from vulgarisation and distortion by opportunist elements of the labor movement.

But long before the war it became increasingly clear that, to the extent that the internal as well as the international situation of individual countries became more complicated, the solution of the problems of the labor movement of each individual country through the medium of some international centre would meet with insuperable obstacles.

Concretely, the declaration asked the member sections to approve: To dissolve the Communist International as a guiding centre of the international labor movement, releasing sections of the Communist International from the obligations ensuing from the constitution and decisions of the Congresses of the Communist International.

After endorsements of the declaration were received from the member sections, the International was dissolved. The dissolution was interpreted as Stalin wishing to calm his World War II allies (particularly Franklin D. Roosevelt and Winston Churchill) and to keep them from suspecting the Soviet Union of pursuing a policy of trying to foment revolution in other countries.

Successor organizations 
The Research Institutes 100 and 205 worked for the International and later were moved to the International Department of the Central Committee of the Communist Party of the Soviet Union, founded at roughly the same time that the Comintern was abolished in 1943, although its specific duties during the first several years of its existence are unknown.

Following the June 1947 Paris Conference on Marshall Aid, Stalin gathered a grouping of key European communist parties in September and set up the Cominform, or Communist Information Bureau, often seen as a substitute to the Comintern. It was a network made up of the communist parties of Bulgaria, Czechoslovakia, France, Hungary, Italy, Poland, Romania, the Soviet Union and Yugoslavia (led by Josip Broz Tito and expelled in June 1948). The Cominform was dissolved in 1956 following Stalin's 1953 death and the 20th Congress of the Communist Party of the Soviet Union.

While the communist parties of the world no longer had a formal international organization, they continued to maintain close relations with each other through a series of international forums. In the period directly after the Comintern's dissolution, periodical meetings of communist parties were held in Moscow. Moreover, World Marxist Review, a joint periodical of the communist parties, played an important role in coordinating the communist movement up to the break-up of the Eastern Bloc in 1989–1991.

British historian Jonathan Haslam reports that even after in Moscow archives:
all references to the Communist International and later the international department of the central committee, which drove the revolutionary side of foreign policy, were removed from published diplomatic documents, in order to fit in with the prevailing dogma established by Vladimir Lenin that the Soviet Government had nothing to do with Comintern. I gave up co-editing a series of documents on Russo-American relations because my Russian colleague could not or would not get over that hurdle....Even today [2020], when the Russians are more liberal in their censorship of documentary publications, one has to verify where possible through other sources independent of Moscow. And although Comintern’s archives are available on the web, most of it them are still closed to the reader, even though officially declassified, and much of it is in German only. One always has to ask, what has been cut out deliberately?

Comintern-sponsored international organizations 
Several international organizations were sponsored by the Comintern in this period:
 Young Communist International (1919–1943)
 Red International of Labour Unions (Profintern, formed in 1920)
 Communist Women's International (formed in 1920)
 International Red Aid (MOPR, formed in 1922)
 Red Peasant International (Krestintern, formed in 1923)
 Red Sport International (Sportintern)
 International of the Proletarian Freethinkers (1925–1933)
 League against Imperialism (formed in 1927)
 Workers International Relief

International Liaison Department 

The OMS (otdel mezhdunarodnoy svyazi), also known in English as the International Liaison Department (1921–1939), was the most secret department of the Comintern. It has also been translated as the Illegal Liaison Section and Foreign Liaison Department.

Historian Thomas L. Sakmyster describes: The OMS was the Comintern's department for the coordination of subversive and conspiratorial activities. Some of its functions overlapped with those of the main Soviet intelligence agencies, the OGPU and the GRU, whose agents sometimes were assigned to the Comintern. But the OMS maintained its own set of operations and had its own representative on the central committees of each Communist party abroad. In 2012, historian David McKnight stated: The most intense practical application of the conspiratorial work of the Comintern was carried out by its international liaison service, the OMS. This body undertook clandenstine courier activities and work which supported underground political activities. These included the transport of money and letters, the manufacture of passports and other false documents and technical support to underground parties, such as managing "safe houses" and establishing businesses overseas as cover activities.

World congresses and plenums

Congresses

Plenums of ECCI

Related meetings

Bureaus 

 Amsterdam Bureau of the Communist International
 Far Eastern Bureau of the Communist International
 Scandinavian Bureau of the Communist International
 Southern Bureau of the Communist International
 Balkan Bureau of the Communist International
 Vienna Bureau of the Communist International

See also 
 Anti-Comintern Pact
 Bolshevization
 Communist International, Its magazine
 Communist University of the National Minorities of the West
 Communist University of the Toilers of the East
 Communist Workers' International
 Executive Committee of the Communist International
 Foreign affairs of the Soviet Union'
 Foreign relations of the Soviet Union
 International Communist Opposition
 International Entente Against the Third International
 International Lenin School
 International relations (1919–1939)
 International Revolutionary Marxist Centre
 International Working Union of Socialist Parties (2 1⁄2 International founded by Austro-Marxists)
 Moscow Sun Yat-sen University
 Spanish Civil War
 Stalinism

 Lists
 List of communist parties
 List of delegates of the 1st Comintern Congress
 List of delegates of the 2nd Comintern Congress
 List of left-wing internationals
 List of members of the Comintern

 Internationals
 First International
 Second International
 Fourth International
 Fifth International

Notes

References

Further reading 

 Barrett, James R. "What Went Wrong? The Communist Party, the US, and the Comintern." American Communist History 17.2 (2018): 176-184.
 Belogurova, Anna. "Networks, Parties, and the" Oppressed Nations": The Comintern and Chinese Communists Overseas, 1926–1935." Cross-Currents: East Asian History and Culture Review 6.2 (2017): 558-582. online
 Belogurova, Anna. The Nanyang Revolution: The Comintern and Chinese Networks in Southeast Asia, 1890–1957 (Cambridge UP, 2019). focus on Malaya
 Caballero, Manuel. Latin America and the Comintern, 1919-1943 (Cambridge University Press, 2002)

 Carr, E.H.  Twilight of the Comintern, 1930–1935. New York: Pantheon Books, 1982. online free to borrow
 Chase, William J. Enemies within the Gates? The Comintern and the Stalinist Repression, 1934–1939. (Yale UP, 2001).
 Dobronravin, Nikolay. "The Comintern, 'Negro Self-Determination' and Black Revolutions in the Caribbean." Interfaces Brasil/Canadá 20 (2020): 1-18. online
 Drachkovitch, M. M. ed. The Revolutionary Internationals (Stanford UP, 1966).
 Drachewych, Oleksa. "The Comintern and the Communist Parties of South Africa, Canada, and Australia on Questions of Imperialism, Nationality and Race, 1919-1943" (PhD dissertation, McMaster University, 2017) online.

 Dullin, Sabine, and Brigitte Studer. "Communism+ transnational: the rediscovered equation of internationalism in the Comintern years." Twentieth Century Communism 14.14 (2018): 66–95.
 Gankin, Olga Hess and Harold Henry Fisher. The Bolsheviks and the World War: The Origin of the Third International. (Stanford UP, 1940) online.
 Gupta, Sobhanlal Datta. Comintern and the Destiny of Communism in India: 1919-1943 (2006) online

 Haithcox, John Patrick. Communism and nationalism in India: MN Roy and Comintern policy, 1920–1939 (1971). online
 Hallas, Duncan. The Comintern: The History of the Third International. London: Bookmarks, 1985.
 Hopkirk, Peter. Setting the East Ablaze: Lenin's Dream of a Empire in Asia 1984 (1984).
 Ikeda, Yoshiro. "Time and the Comintern: Rethinking the Cultural Impact of the Russian Revolution on Japanese Intellectuals." in Culture and Legacy of the Russian Revolution: Rhetoric and Performance–Religious Semantics–Impact on Asia (2020): 227+.
 James, C.L.R., World Revolution 1917–1936: The Rise and Fall of the Communist International. (1937). online
 Jeifets, Víctor, and Lazar Jeifets. "The Encounter between the Cuban Left and the Russian Revolution: The Communist Party and the Comintern." Historia Crítica 64 (2017): 81-100.
 Kennan, George F. Russia and the West Under Lenin and Stalin (1961) pp. 151–93. online
 Lazitch, Branko and Milorad M. Drachkovitch. Biographical dictionary of the Comintern (2nd ed. 1986).
 McDermott, Kevin. "Stalin and the Comintern during the 'Third Period', 1928-33." European history quarterly 25.3 (1995): 409-429.
 McDermott, Kevin. "The History of the Comintern in Light of New Documents," in Tim Rees and Andrew Thorpe (eds.), International Communism and the Communist International, 1919–43. Manchester, England: Manchester University Press, 1998.
 McDermott, Kevin, and J. Agnew. The Comintern: a History of International Communism from Lenin to Stalin. Basingstoke, 1996.
 Melograni, Piero. Lenin and the Myth of World Revolution: Ideology and Reasons of State 1917–1920, Humanities Press, 1990.
 Priestland, David. The Red Flag: A History of Communism. 2010.
 Riddell, John. "The Comintern in 1922: The Periphery Pushes Back." Historical Materialism 22.3–4 (2014): 52–103.  online
 Smith, S. A. (ed.) The Oxford Handbook of the History of Communism (2014), ch 10: "The Comintern".
 Taber, Mike (ed.), The Communist Movement at a Crossroads: Plenums of the Communist International's Executive Committee, 1922–1923. John Riddell, trans. Chicago: Haymarket Books, 2019.
 Ulam, Adam B. Expansion and Coexistence: Soviet Foreign Policy, 1917–1973. (2nd ed. Praeger Publishers, 1974). online
 Valeva, Yelena. The CPSU, the Comintern, and the Bulgarians (Routledge, 2018).
 Worley, Matthew et al. (eds.) Bolshevism, Stalinism and the Comintern: Perspectives on Stalinization, 1917–53. (2008).
 The Comintern and its Critics (Special issue of Revolutionary History Volume 8, no 1, Summer 2001).

Historiography
 Drachewych, Oleksa. "The Communist Transnational? Transnational studies and the history of the Comintern." History Compass 17.2 (2019): e12521.
 McDermott, Kevin. "Rethinking the Comintern: Soviet Historiography, 1987–1991," Labour History Review, 57#3 (1992), pp. 37–58.

 McIlroy, John, and Alan Campbell. "Bolshevism, Stalinism and the Comintern: A historical controversy revisited." Labor History 60.3 (2019): 165-192. online
 Redfern, Neil. "The Comintern and Imperialism: A Balance Sheet." Journal of Labor and Society 20.1 (2017): 43-60.

Primary sources 

 Banac, I. ed. The Diary of Georgi Dimitrov 1933-1949 (Yale UP, 2003).
 Davidson, Apollon, et al. (eds.) South Africa and the Communist International: A Documentary History. 2 vol. 2003.
 Degras, Jane T. The Communist International, 1919–43 (3 Vols. 1956); documents; online vol 1 1919–22; vol 2 1923–28  vol 3 1929-43 (PDF).
 Firsov, Fridrikh I., Harvey Klehr, and John Earl Haynes, eds. Secret Cables of the Comintern, 1933–1943. New Haven, CT: Yale University Press, 2014. online review

 Gruber, Helmut. International Communism in the Era of Lenin: A Documentary History (Cornell University Press, 1967)
 Kheng, Cheah Boon, ed. From PKI to the Comintern, 1924–1941 (Cornell University Press, 2018). on China
 Riddell, John (ed.): The Communist International in Lenin's Time, Vol. 1: Lenin's Struggle for a Revolutionary International: Documents: 1907–1916: The Preparatory Years. New York: Monad Press, 1984.
 Riddell, John (ed.): The Communist International in Lenin's Time, Vol. 2: The German Revolution and the Debate on Soviet Power: Documents: 1918–1919: Preparing the Founding Congress. New York: Pathfinder Press, 1986.
 Riddell, John (ed.) The Communist International in Lenin's Time, Vol. 3: Founding the Communist International: Proceedings and Documents of the First Congress: March 1919. New York: Pathfinder Press, 1987.
 Riddell, John (ed.) The Communist International in Lenin's Time:  Workers of the World and Oppressed Peoples Unite! Proceedings and Documents of the Second Congress, 1920. In Two Volumes. New York: Pathfinder Press, 1991.
 Riddell, John (ed.) The Communist International in Lenin's Time: To See the Dawn: Baku, 1920: First Congress of the Peoples of the East. New York: Pathfinder Press, 1993.
 Riddell, John (ed.) Toward the United Front: Proceedings of the Fourth Congress of the Communist International, 1922. Lieden, NL: Brill, 2012.

External links 
 Comintern History Archive Marxists Internet Archive

 Lenin's speech: The Third, Communist International
 Site Comintern Archives 
 Site Comintern Archives 
 Program of the Communist International. Together With Its Constitution (adopted at 6th World Congress in 1928)
 The Communist International Journal of the Comintern, Marxists Internet Archive
 Outline History of the Communist International
 The Internationale by R. Palme Dutt, 1964
 Report from Moscow, 3rd International congress, 1920 by Otto Rühle
 Article on the Third International from the Encyclopædia Britannica

 
Communist organizations
History of socialism
Left-wing internationals
Far-left politics
Foreign relations of the Soviet Union
Political internationals
Stalinist organizations
Stalinism
Defunct international non-governmental organizations
Politics of the Soviet Union
1919 establishments in Russia
1943 disestablishments in the Soviet Union
Organizations established in 1919
Organizations disestablished in 1943
International Socialist Organisations